Airwave(s) may refer to:

Telecommunication 
 Radio wave, particularly artificial waves generated for human communication
 Airwave (communications network), a mobile communications network dedicated for use by emergency services in Great Britain
 AirWave Wireless, a Wi-Fi hotspot provider, acquired by Aruba Networks in 2008

Characters 
 Airwave (G.I. Joe), a character in the G.I. Joe: A Real American Hero universe
 Air Wave, three DC Comics superheroes
 Airwave, a Decepticon in the Transformers Micromasters subline

Music 
 Airwaves (Badfinger album), 1979
Airwaves (Badfinger song)
 "Airwaves", a song by Kraftwerk from Radio-Activity
 Airwaves (Ike & Tina Turner album), 1978
 "Airwave", a song by Rank 1
 "Airwaves" (Brett Kissel song), from Pick Me Up
 "Airwaves", a song by Thomas Dolby from The Golden Age of Wireless
 Airwaves, a Welsh 1970s pop-rock band led by musician and songwriter John David 
 Iceland Airwaves, an annual music festival in Reykjavik
 Angels & Airwaves, an American space rock band
 Laurent Véronnez, aka Airwave, trance music composer (French page)

Other uses 
 Airwaves (gum), a brand of chewing gum sold by Wrigley's
 Airwaves (TV series), a 1986–1990 Canadian sitcom
 Honda Airwave, a 2005–2010 subcompact car
 Airwave, a fictional airline in Microsoft Flight Simulator X
Airwave Gliders, an Austrian aircraft manufacturer
 Airwave (horse), a British Thoroughbred racehorse
 Airwaves (Over the Edge), a set of three role-playing game adventures